Perioperative stress dose of steroids to mitigate this rare but potentially fatal complications of perioperative use of steroid such as full-blown adrenal crisis in the perioperative period due to the secondary adrenal insufficiency. Various exogenous steroid preparations are used for a wide range of indications.


Stress doses
Emergency corticosteroid supplementation in patients taking exogenous corticosteroids:

Pediatric doses
Emergent intramuscular dosing can be given if child is not tolerating oral medications or unable to get IV within 15 minutes. IM hydrocortisone sodium succinate doses are:
 25 mg for child 3 years and younger
 50 mg for children >3 yrs – 12 years
 100 mg for children 12 years and older.

References

Corticosteroids